Monica Eulalia Banegas Cedillo (born August 8, 1977) is an Ecuadorian politician. Vice President of the Council for Citizen Participation and Social Control of Ecuador from 2009 to 2015.

Life 
She was born in 1977 and educated in Spain at the University of Alicante; in Italy at the Università degli Studi Di Palermo, Italy and the International University of La Rioja in Spain. From there she began many years of activism.

References

External links 
 

1977 births
Living people
21st-century Ecuadorian politicians